Gynomonoecy is defined as the presence of both female and hermaphrodite flowers on the same individual of a plant species. It is prevalent in Asteraceae but is poorly understood.

It is a  monomorphic sexual system alongside monoecy, andromonoecy and trimonoecy.

Occurrence 
This sexual system occurs in about 2.8% of flowering plants. It is present in 3% of Silene species and 23 families of flowering plants, but is most common in the daisy family, Asteraceae. About 200 of the approximately 23000 species in the Asteraceae are gynomonoecious.

Evolution 
Gynomonoecy may be an intermediate evolutionary state between monoecy and hermaphroditism. It is also hypothesized to be the ancestor to trimonoecy.

Gynomonecy evolved once in Hawaiian Tetramolopium.

In families like Compositae or Chenopodiaceae, gynomonoecy is considered leading path to monoecy from hermaphroditism and vice versa.

References 

Plant reproduction
Sexual system